Frenulectomy of the penis is a surgical procedure for cutting and removal of the frenulum of prepuce of penis, to correct a condition known as frenulum breve. This condition prevents the full retraction of the foreskin with or without an erection.

It is a simple and normally painless procedure that is performed in a urologist's office. First the physician applies a local anesthetic, such as lidocaine/prilocaine cream on the frenulum and surrounding area. If the patient retains any feeling there after the anesthetic has had time to take effect, the physician may recommend that the procedure be performed in a hospital, with stronger anesthesia.

Once the frenulum is cut, the physician applies stitches to close the wound. The patient may be given a prescription for pain killers to take in case there is pain afterwards, but usually the only discomfort is from the pricking of the stitches on the foreskin. Once the stitches are removed, in about seven days, normal sexual activity can resume.

References

External links 

Surgical removal procedures
Male genital surgery
Penis

it:Frenulo corto